UL or Ul may refer to:

Arts and media
 UL (The Belgariad), one of the gods in David Eddings' fantasy saga The Belgariad
 New Hampshire Union Leader, a statewide daily newspaper in New Hampshire, US
 Unwritten Law, an alternative rock band from Poway, California

Businesses and organizations 
 Cambridge University Library or University Library, a library at numerous universities
 SriLankan Airlines (IATA code UL)
 UL (safety organization), an American worldwide safety consulting and certification company previously known as Underwriters Laboratories
 Unia Lewicy a Polish political party
 Unilever (stock symbol), a multinational corporation
 Upplands Lokaltrafik, a Swedish transport company

Universities

In the United Kingdom
 University of Lincoln
 University of London
 University of Leicester

In the United States
 University of Louisiana at Lafayette, Louisiana

In other countries
 Université Laval, Québec, Canada
 University of Leoben, Austria
 University of Lethbridge, Alberta, Canada
 University of Liberia, Monrovia
 University of Limerick, Ireland
 University of Lima, Perú
 University of Linz, Austria
 University of Lisbon, Portugal
 University of Limpopo, South Africa
 University of Ljubljana, Universitas Labacensis, Slovenia

Science and technology

Computing and telecommunication
 Uplink, in telecommunication
 Upload, the transfer of electronic data
 Unordered list, an HTML element
 ul, a UNIX command for translating underscores to terminal specific codes for displaying underlined text

Other uses in science and technology
 3271 Ul, an asteroid
 Microlitre or microliter (µl), a unit of volume
 Tolerable Upper Intake Level, part of the Dietary Reference Intake system of the US National Academy of Sciences

Other uses
 Ul (mythology), a lunar deity in Vanuatuan mythology
 Ul (Portugal), a civil parish in Portugal
 Ultralight aviation
 Unlimited liability

See also
 Ull (disambiguation)